Red and Blue may refer to:

 Red and Blue (album), a 1983 album by Cee Farrow
 Pokémon Red and Blue, role-playing games developed by Game Freak and published by Nintendo for the Game Boy
 "The Red and Blue", a popular song at the University of Pennsylvania
 The Red and the Blue (film), a 2012 Italian film
 The Red and the Blue (TV series), a 1976 Italian animated children's series
 The Red and the Blue: The 1990s and the Birth of Political Tribalism, a 2018 book by Steve Kornacki
 Red & Blue, a program on CBS News (streaming service)

See also
 
 "Blue and Red", a song by ManuElla
 Red vs. Blue, animated web series by Rooster Teeth
 Red and Blue Chair, designed in 1917 by Gerrit Rietveld
 Red states and blue states, the states of the United States carried by Republican or Democratic presidential candidates, respectively